Ardian may refer to:
 Ardian (company), is a private equity investment firm (formerly Axa Private Equity)
 Ardian (given name), Albanian given name
 Ardian, Iran, a village in Semnan Province, Iran
 A proposed rank for Air Marshal in the Royal Air Force